The Rural Municipality of Blaine Lake No. 434 is a rural municipality (RM) in the Canadian province of Saskatchewan within Census Division No. 16 and  Division No. 5. The RM extends east to the North Saskatchewan River and north to the Village of Marcelin.

History 

The RM of Blaine Lake No. 434 incorporated as a rural municipality on December 9, 1912.

The story of Sgt John Wilson: One of Canada's most sensational murders took place close to Blaine Lake in 1917. The only Royal Canadian Mounted Police officer ever to be hanged for murder, Sgt John Wilson killed his wife, Polly Wilson, and his unborn child, to marry Jessie Patterson of Blaine Lake. They wed two days after his wife's murder. Polly Wilson had traveled to Canada from Scotland, leaving behind two children, and was pregnant with a third when she was killed. Her body was discovered in a culvert near Waldheim.

Geography

Communities and localities 
The following urban municipalities are surrounded by the RM.

Towns
Blaine Lake

Villages
Marcelin

Demographics 

Government 
The RM of Blaine Lake No. 434 is governed by an elected municipal council and an appointed administrator that meets on the second Tuesday of every month. The reeve of the RM is William Chalmers while its administrator is Jennifer Gutknecht. The RM's office is located in Blaine Lake.

References 

B
 
Division No. 16, Saskatchewan